Clear Lake is an unincorporated community and census-designated place (CDP) in Marshall County, South Dakota, United States, surrounding a natural lake of the same name. Within the Lake Traverse Indian Reservation, it was first listed as a CDP prior to the 2020 census. The population was 170 at the 2020 census.

It is in the southeast part of the county, bordered to the northeast by South Dakota Highway 10, which leads northwest  to Lake City and southeast  to Sisseton.

Demographics

References 

Census-designated places in Marshall County, South Dakota
Census-designated places in South Dakota